The 1899 Ohio gubernatorial election was held on November 2, 1899. Republican nominee George K. Nash defeated Democratic nominee John R. McLean with 45.94% of the vote.

General election

Candidates
Major party candidates
George K. Nash, Republican 
John R. McLean, Democratic

Other candidates
Samuel M. Jones, Independent
Seth H. Ellis, Union Reform
George M. Hammell, Prohibition
Robert Bandlow, Socialist Labor

Results

References

1899
Ohio
Gubernatorial